See also Cumberland (disambiguation), Cumberland (surname).

Frederick William Cumberland (10 April 1821 – 5 August 1881) was a Canadian engineer, architect and politician. He represented the riding of Algoma in the 1st and 2nd Ontario Parliaments, and he served in the House of Commons of Canada from 1871 to 1872.

Life and career 
Cumberland was born in London, England, and grew up in Rathmines, Dublin, where his father was employed at Dublin Castle. His mother died there. The family returned to London in the mid-1830s, where he studied at King's College School and apprenticed as a civil engineer. Starting in 1843, he was employed with the engineering department of the British Admiralty, working on the construction of dry docks and fortifications.

In 1845, Cumberland married Wilmot Mary Bramley, whose sisters had married prominent men in the city of Toronto, and he came to that city with his wife in 1847. He worked there as a surveyor and as an engineer for the united counties of York and Peel.

In partnership with architect Thomas Ridout, he designed the Cathedral Church of St. James and School, the York County Court House, and a post office. Later, with William George Storm, Cumberland designed other important public buildings in Toronto.

At the University of Toronto, he designed University College, the Provincial Magnetic Observatory (1853–55) and the Director's Residence (1858; demolished in 1901), as well as major additions and reconstruction of the Centre Block (1856–59) of the Osgoode Hall law courts.

Cumberland designed residences for prominent people living in Toronto. He also designed the Queen Street Wesleyan Chapel (1856), which was demolished c. 1980. He built several public buildings in Hamilton.

During the 1850s, Cumberland became involved in railway management at the Ontario, Simcoe and Huron Railroad Union Company (later the Northern Railway Company), as well as other railway and related companies of the time. From 1868, Cumberland served as a director of the Rama Timber Transport Company. As was common at the time, he used railway money to gain the support of Members of Parliament and to help elect candidates favourable to their cause. After Cumberland's death, the Northern Railway Company was absorbed by the Grand Trunk Railway. He was also director of a number of banks and a member of the Toronto Board of Education.

Cumberland helped establish a new battalion in the local militia during the 1860s. He was a member of the senate of the University of Toronto. He was also a freemason, becoming deputy grand master for the Toronto district. He died in Toronto in 1881.

Notable works

See also 
List of oldest buildings and structures in Toronto

References

External links 
 
 
 Historic Places in Canada

1821 births
1881 deaths
People educated at King's College School, London
Members of the House of Commons of Canada from Ontario
Progressive Conservative Party of Ontario MPPs
Conservative Party of Canada (1867–1942) MPs
English emigrants to Canada
19th-century Canadian architects
People from Rathmines